Can Yayınları (English: Life Publications) is a publishing company based in Istanbul, Turkey.

It has published authors including Orhan Pamuk, Metin Kaçan and Hikmet Temel Akarsu. It publishes both fiction and non-fiction books. It is a member of the Turkish Publishers Association.

It was founded in 1981 by Erdal Öz and others.

References

External links
 Can Yayınları web site

Book publishing companies of Turkey
Publishing companies established in 1981
Turkish companies established in 1981